Nathaniel Bowman (1608–1682) was the first Bowman immigrant to be among the earliest settlers of the Massachusetts Bay colony. He had the rank of gentlemen in the public records, indicating that he came from some distinguished English stock. On October 19, 1630, he applied to the general court, but his name doesn't appear on the list of applicants granted the oath of Freeman.  He was one of the original proprietors of Watertown, Massachusetts. Around 1650, he removed to the Parish of Cambridge Farms (Lexington) where many of his descendants have lived.

See also
 Thirteen Colonies
 Richard Saltonstall (1586–1661), led the settlement of Watertown in 1630
 New England Confederation (1643–1684)
 New World

Notes

References
 Crane, E (1907). "Historic Homes and Institutions and Genealogical and Personal Memoirs of Worcester County, Massachusetts, with a History of Worcester Society of Antiquity", The Lewis Publishing Company.
 Morris, T (1894). "Ephraim and Pamela (Converse) Morris Their Ancestors and Descendants", S.N.

People from Watertown, Massachusetts
People of colonial Massachusetts
1610 births
1682 deaths